The Ivan Radoev Dramatic Theatre (Dramatichen teatar ”Ivan Radoev”) is a theatre in Pleven, Bulgaria. Its edifice in the centre of the city was designed by an Austro-Hungarian architect and built 1893–1895. The theatre was founded in 1918 as the Pleven Municipal Theatre, the first premiere being Kean by Alexandre Dumas, père (6 February 1919).

External links
 Official website

Buildings and structures in Pleven
Theatres in Bulgaria
Tourist attractions in Pleven Province